Samuel (Sam) Rabin, originally Samuel Rabinovitch, (20 June 1903 – 20 December 1991) was an English sculptor, artist, teacher, singer, wrestler and Olympic bronze medalist.

Family and early life
Rabin, who was Jewish, was born Samuel Rabinovitch on 20 June 1903 at Dewhurst Street, Cheetham, North Manchester. He was the son of Jacob Rabinovitch (1872–1962) and Sarah Rabinovitch (née Kraselschikow, 1879–1961), both Imperial Russian Jewish exiles from Vitebsk (now in Belarus). His father was a cap cutter and later a wholesale milliner; his mother was a jewellery assembler.

During his childhood, the family moved to Salford where Rabin grew up and where his parents encouraged his talent for drawing. In 1914 Rabin won a scholarship to the Manchester Municipal School of Art making him, at the age of 11, the youngest pupil ever to attend the college. There he was taught drawing by French artist Adolphe Valette. In 1921 he moved to the Slade School of Fine Art in London where he continued his studies under Henry Tonks until 1924.

In about 1935, Rabin married Ida Lily Shuster, but they were divorced. In 1956, he married Frances Kaye (formerly Lucienne Karpeles, 1917–1988). The couple had one son, David, born in 1960.

Career

After the Slade, Rabin studied in Paris where he met and was greatly impressed and influenced by sculptor Charles Despiau.

Rabin's own sculpture from this time is little known as he was a perfectionist and destroyed work that he considered unsatisfactory. In 1928, working under his full surname, he was commissioned by architect Charles Holden to carve West Wind, one of eight personifications of the four winds for the headquarters of the Underground Electric Railways Company of London at 55 Broadway. The sculpture was partly completed in-situ on the building. In 1930, he produced his only other public sculptures; two decorative winged masks, The Past and The Future, for the Daily Telegraph building in Fleet Street. These were carved on the building directly from the scaffold.

Both commissions were well received at the time, but Rabin was unable to make a living as a sculptor and turned to another career – wrestling, for which he abbreviated his surname.

Rabin was physically strong and had boxed and wrestled as an amateur to fund his art. He won a bronze medal in the middleweight division of the free-style wrestling at the 1928 Olympics in Amsterdam. Rabin turned professional in 1932 and fought as Rabin the Cat and Sam Radnor the Hebrew Jew across Britain. Alexander Korda cast him as a wrestler in The Private Life of Henry VIII in 1933 and as Mendoza, a Jewish prize-fighter, in The Scarlet Pimpernel in 1934.

Despite lacking any formal musical training, Rabin was a talented baritone and worked professionally during the 1940s singing with Stars in Battledress and sang operatic arias with the army's Classical Music Group. In 1946 he auditioned for La Scala's conductor, Victor de Sabata.

In 1949, Rabin began teaching drawing at Goldsmiths College of Art in New Cross, London. His disciplined teaching style including the production of demonstration works, followed that of his own teacher, Valette. His students included Mary Quant, Bridget Riley and Tom Keating. He left Goldsmiths in 1965, due to differences over teaching methods and taught at Bournemouth College of Art until 1985 and then at Poole Art Centre until shortly before his death in December 1991.

Works
Little of Rabin's work from before his time at Goldsmiths College survived his critical destruction and an accidental destruction by a wartime landlady. Much of what exists are figure studies prepared as demonstrations for students and coloured boxing scenes produced with thickly applied wax crayons of his own making. Rabin exhibited rarely, but had a retrospective at Dulwich Picture Gallery in 1985–86. He also exhibited at Southampton City Art Gallery 8 Feb – 23 March 1986 and Salford Art Gallery 17 April – 23 May 1986.

Collections containing his work include the British Museum, the Government Art Collection and the Musée National du Sport in Paris.

See also
List of select Jewish wrestlers

Notes and references

Notes

References

Bibliography

External links
 

1903 births
1991 deaths
People from Cheetham Hill
Olympic wrestlers of Great Britain
Wrestlers at the 1928 Summer Olympics
British male sport wrestlers
Olympic bronze medallists for Great Britain
Alumni of the Slade School of Fine Art
Academics of Goldsmiths, University of London
British architectural sculptors
British Jews
Jewish sculptors
Modern sculptors
English operatic baritones
Olympic medalists in wrestling
Jewish wrestlers
English people of Belarusian-Jewish descent
20th-century British sculptors
British male sculptors
20th-century English male singers
20th-century English singers
Medalists at the 1928 Summer Olympics
20th-century British male artists